Rajmond Debevec (born 29 March 1963) is a Slovenian sport shooter. He has won three Olympic and ten World Championship medals in shooting. He formerly held the world record in the 50 meter rifle 3 positions event.

Career
Debevec started shooting in 1971 and became a member of the Yugoslavian junior national team in 1979. Debevec joined the Military Sport Squad of the Slovenian Army in 1991 and holds the rank of Warrant Officer.

Olympic Games
He won his first medal in 1980 by participating in the Junior European Championships. He represented Yugoslavia at the Olympic Games in 1984 and 1988, and Slovenia in 1992, 1996, 2000, 2004, 2008, and 2012. He won gold at the 2000 Summer Olympics in Sydney, where he competed in the event 50 metre rifle three positions.

His appearance at eight Olympic Games are the most ever by a Slovenian or Yugoslavian athlete. Latvian shooter Afanasijs Kuzmins is the only shooter with more Olympic appearances than Debevec; Kuzmins competed in his ninth games at the 2012 Summer Olympics, where Debevec competed for the eighth time.

World Cup and other competitions
Debevec formerly held the world record for 50m rifle three position with 1186 points, which he set in Munich at the World Cup Final in 1992. He also held the Olympic record (1177 points) for the same event, which he set during his gold medal-winning performance at the 2000 Summer Olympics.

He has won two world military championships in 300m three positions in 2006 and 300m rapid fire rifle in 2005 and 2008. He has also competed in World Cup events for crossbow, air rifle, small-bore rifle, and big bore rifle.

Olympic results

See also
List of athletes with the most appearances at Olympic Games

References

External links

Debevec's home page 

1963 births
Living people
People from Postojna
Slovenian male sport shooters
Yugoslav male sport shooters
ISSF rifle shooters
Shooters at the 1984 Summer Olympics
Shooters at the 1988 Summer Olympics
Shooters at the 1992 Summer Olympics
Shooters at the 1996 Summer Olympics
Shooters at the 2000 Summer Olympics
Shooters at the 2004 Summer Olympics
Shooters at the 2008 Summer Olympics
Olympic shooters of Yugoslavia
Olympic shooters of Slovenia
Olympic gold medalists for Slovenia
Olympic bronze medalists for Slovenia
World record holders in shooting
Olympic medalists in shooting
Shooters at the 2012 Summer Olympics
Medalists at the 2012 Summer Olympics
Medalists at the 2008 Summer Olympics
Shooters at the 2015 European Games
European Games competitors for Slovenia
Medalists at the 2000 Summer Olympics
Mediterranean Games bronze medalists for Slovenia
Mediterranean Games medalists in shooting
Competitors at the 2013 Mediterranean Games
Shooters at the 2019 European Games
20th-century Slovenian people
21st-century Slovenian people